Ileana is a commune in Călărași County, Muntenia, Romania. It is composed of nine villages: Arțari, Florica, Ileana, Podari, Răsurile, Răzoarele, Satu Nou, Ștefănești, and Vlăiculești.

As of 2011 the population of Ileana is 3,702.

References

Communes in Călărași County
Localities in Muntenia